Ronald Wallace is an American poet, and Felix Pollak Professor of Poetry & Halls-Bascom Professor of English at the University of Wisconsin–Madison.

Life
He was born in Cedar Rapids, Iowa
He grew up in Saint Louis, Missouri.
He graduated from the College of Wooster, and the University of Michigan.

His work has appeared in The New Yorker, The Atlantic, The Nation, Poetry, and The Paris Review.

Works
For Dear Life, University of Pittsburgh, 2015
For a Limited Time Only, University of Pittsburgh, 2008, 

Long for this world: new and selected poems, University of Pittsburgh Press, 2003, 
Uses of Adversity, University of Pittsburgh Press, 1998, 
The Makings of Happiness, University of Pittsburgh Press, 1991, 
People and Dog in the Sun, University of Pittsburgh Press, 1987, 
Tunes for Bears to Dance To, University of Pittsburgh Press, 1983, 
Plums, Stones, Kisses & Hooks, University of Missouri Press, 1982, 

Short story 
Quick bright things: stories, Mid-List Press, 2000, 

Non-fiction
The last laugh: form and affirmation in the contemporary American comic novel, University of Missouri Press, 1979, 
God be with the clown: humor in American poetry, University of Missouri Press, 1984, 
Henry James and the Comic Form. University of Michigan Press, 1975,

References

External links
http://english.wisc.edu/wallace/

Living people
Writers from Cedar Rapids, Iowa
College of Wooster alumni
University of Michigan alumni
University of Wisconsin–Madison faculty
Writers from Iowa
Writers from Missouri
Writers from Wisconsin
Year of birth missing (living people)